The 1984 Association of Mid-Continent Universities Tournament took place from May 4 through 6. All regular season finishers of the league's seven teams met in the double-elimination tournament held in Chicago, Illinois.  won the tournament.

Format and seeding
The first year of the conference did not have a round-robin regular season schedule.  Teams were matched for the first round by a random draw, and then played a double-elimination tournament.

Tournament

All-Tournament Team

References

Tournament
Summit League Baseball Tournament
Association of Mid-Continent Universities baseball tournament
Association of Mid-Continent Universities baseball tournament